Womanlight is a 1979 film by Costa-Gavras based on the 1977 novel Clair de femme by Romain Gary.

Cast
 Yves Montand as Michel Follin
 Romy Schneider as Lydia Tovalski
 Romolo Valli as Galba
 Lila Kedrova as Sonia Tovalski
 Heinz Bennent as Georges
 Roberto Benigni as The barman
 Dieter Schidor as Sven Svensson
 Catherine Allégret as The prostitute
 François Perrot as Alain
 Daniel Mesguich as Inspector Curbec
 Gabriel Jabbour as Sacha
 Jean-Claude Bouillaud as The pilot
 Gabriel Dussurget as The theater director
 Jacques Dynam as The taxi
 Jean Reno as The cop
 Michel Robin as The doctor
 Miranda Campa as The maid
 Giuliana Calandra

References

External links
 
 

1979 films
Films about suicide
Films based on French novels
Films based on works by Romain Gary
Films directed by Costa Gavras
French drama films
West German films
Italian drama films
Constantin Film films
Gaumont Film Company films
German drama films
1970s French films
1970s Italian films
1970s German films